Dema Deity is a concept introduced by Adolf Ellegard Jensen following his research on religious sacrifice. Jensen was a German ethnologist who furthered the theory of Cultural Morphology founded by Leo Frobenius.

Description
The term dema comes from the Marind-anim peoples of south-west Papua and has been used to refer to similar concepts in Melanesian Religion and elsewhere.

Dema Deities are mythological figures (human, animal, or super-human) who have given to certain peoples their land, food-crops, totems, and knowledge such as how to cultivate crops, raise poultry, make boats, perform dances, and perform sacred rituals.                                                                                                                                                                      
In some cases, such as in the Hainuwele myth of Seram recorded by Jensen, it is claimed that from their dismembered bodies, blood, etc., came the different communities that are now in existence, together with their territory.

Both local culture and natural environment remain infused with the supernatural power of these creative deities.

Examples
 Cronus, from Greek mythology
 Osiris, from Egyptian religion
 Pangu, from Chinese mythology
 Ukemochi, from Shinto religion
 Tiamat, from Babylonian mythology
 Ymir, from Norse mythology

See also
Myth of origins
Culture hero
Religious experience
Uke Mochi

References

Further reading

External links 
   
 
 
 
 
 
   
 
 
 
 
 
 
 
 
 

Conceptions of God
Origin myths
Melanesian mythology
Sacrifice
Ymir
Cronus
Osiris
Tiamat